The Battle of Lost River in November 1872 was the first battle in the Modoc War in the northwestern United States. The skirmish, which was fought near the Lost River along the California–Oregon border, was the result of an attempt by the U.S. 1st Cavalry Regiment of the United States Army to force a band of the Modoc tribe to relocate back to the Klamath Reservation, which they had left in objection of its conditions. 

In the subsequent war, Captain Jack of the Modoc and 53 warriors held off more than 1000 U.S. soldiers for 7 months in the area of the present-day Lava Beds National Monument. Part of this was named Captain Jack's Stronghold in his honor.

Description
In the 1860s, the Modoc had been removed from their traditional home near the Lost River in California to the newly established Klamath Reservation in Oregon. The more numerous Klamath were traditional enemies, and the peoples had conflicts on the reservation. 

In 1872, Kintpuash (Captain Jack) led his band of about 100 Modoc back to their traditional home on Lost River. White settlers had moved into the area during their absence and complained to the government about the returning Modoc, asking that the Indians be forced back to the reservation. On November 27, Bureau of Indian Affairs Superintendent T. B. Odeneal requested Major John Green, commanding officer at Fort Klamath, to furnish sufficient troops to compel Captain Jack to return to the reservation. On November 28, Captain James Jackson, commanding 40 troops, left Fort Klamath for Captain Jack's camp. Reinforced by citizens from Linkville (now Klamath Falls, Oregon), the troops reached Jack's camp on the Lost River about a mile above Emigrant Crossing (now Stone Bridge, Oregon) on November 29.

Wishing to avoid conflict, Captain Jack agreed to go to the reservation. The situation became tense when Captain Jackson demanded he and his warriors disarm.  Captain Jack had never fought the army, and was alarmed at this command, but finally agreed to put down his weapons.

The rest of the Modoc were following his lead, when warrior Scarfaced Charley and an unidentified army sergeant reportedly got into a verbal argument, pulled their revolvers, and shot at each other, both missing. The Modoc scrambled to regain their weapons, and fought a short battle before fleeing toward the border with California. After driving the Modoc from camp, Captain Jackson ordered his troops to retreat to await reinforcements. The casualties in this short battle included one U.S. soldier killed and seven wounded, and two Modoc killed and three wounded.

On their way to the Lava Beds south of Tule Lake, a small band of Modoc under the leadership of Hooker Jim killed 18 settlers on the afternoon of November 29 and morning of November 30. This attack added to calls for the US Army troops to be reinforced and the Modoc suppressed.

References

Lost River
Lost River
Native American history of California
1872 in California
Lost River
November 1872 events